Erronea ovum, common name the egg cowry, is a species of sea snail, a cowry, a marine gastropod mollusk in the family Cypraeidae, the cowries.

Description
The dorsum surface of Erronea ovum is smooth, shiny and generally dark brown, dark olive green or greyish, often with a darker wide trasversal band. They are egg-shaped (hence the Latin name ovum, meaning egg). The base and the margins are usually white or pale brown, with yellowish teeth, but in Erronea ovum chrysostoma the teeth are pink-orange. In the living cowries mantle is greyish, with long tree-shaped sensorial papillae.

Distribution
This species occurs from Southeast Asia to the Southwest Pacific, along the coasts of Japan, East China, Thailand, Indonesia, Malaysia, Papua-New Guinea, western Australia, Philippines, Palau Islands, Solomon Islands, Micronesia and New Caledonia.

Habitat

Subspecies
 Erronea ovum chrysostoma  (F.A. Schilder, 1927) 
 Erronea ovum erici  Lorenz, Bridges & Chiapponi, 2011 
 Erronea ovum ovum  (Gmelin, 1791) : synonym of Erronea ovum (Gmelin, 1791)
 Erronea ovum palauensis  (F.A. Schilder & M. Schilder, 1938)

References
 Lorenz F., Bridges R.J. & Chiapponi M. (2011) A close look at Erronea ovum (Gmelin, 1791) with the description of a new subspecies (Gastropoda: Cypraeidae). Conchylia 41(2): 2-9. [April 2011]

External links
 Biolib
 Ovum
 Erronea ovum

ovum
Gastropods described in 1791
Taxa named by Johann Friedrich Gmelin